Kungsörnen is a Swedish manufacturer of food. It was founded in 1929 in Skåne. The company began by manufacturing flour. The company is owned by Lantmännen. The company's headquarters is a pasta factory located in Järna, just outside Stockholm.

Kungsörnen bought Bageri Skogaholm in 1974 and Korvbrödsbagarn in 1979.

External links
 Kungsörnen

References 

Food and drink companies established in 1929
Swedish companies established in 1929
Food and drink companies of Sweden
Cooperatives in Sweden
Companies based in Södertälje
Södertälje Municipality